La Vall de Laguar is a chain of three village in the province of Alicante and autonomous community of Valencia, Spain. The villages are, from the lowest and first encountered if entering the Val from the town of Orba, the most usual route, Campell, Fleix and Benimaurell.

References

Populated places in the Province of Alicante